Kristina Plahinek (born 18 December 1992) is a Croatian handball player for ŽRK Zamet and the Croatian national team.

She participated at the 2018 European Women's Handball Championship.

International honours
EHF Challenge Cup:
Semifinalst: 2018

References

1992 births
Living people
Handball players from Rijeka
Croatian female handball players
ŽRK Zamet players